Frederic Gregory Brown was an artist & designer born in London in 1887, and died in 1941. He signed his works F Gregory Brown or Gregory Brown.

His father was the art master John Terrell Brown, and he initially completed an apprenticeship in metal work when he left school. After completing his apprenticeship he started out by making art metalwork, and in 1915 he was a founding member of the Design and Industries Association.

In 1914, Gregory started to design posters for London Underground, which he continued to do until 1940 producing over 70 designs. In 1915, he produced the front cover illustration for: IN HOC VINCE The story of A Red Cross Flag, by Florence L. Barclay; He expanded his clientele working with business such as the Empire marketing board, Railway Companies, ICI, Witney Blankets and department stores Bobby & Co. and Derry & Toms.

In 1925, he won Gold Medal at the Paris Exhibition of Decorative Arts for his textile designs and continued to paint pictures in his unique style.

The National Portrait Gallery has a number of photographic portraits of Brown, all taken by Howard Coster in 1927.

References

External links
 London Transport F Gregory Brown Archive page
 British Council page
 
 Pictures of F G Brown in National Portrait Gallery

English artists
1887 births
1941 deaths